Robert Keller Hasty (May 3, 1896 – May 28, 1972) was a professional baseball pitcher in the Major Leagues from  to . Hasty played for the Philadelphia Athletics for all six of his major league seasons. In 1921, Hasty led all American League pitchers in fewest walks per 9 innings pitched, among qualified pitchers.

External links

1896 births
1972 deaths
Sportspeople from the Atlanta metropolitan area
Philadelphia Athletics players
Major League Baseball pitchers
Baseball players from Georgia (U.S. state)
Atlanta Crackers players
Mobile Bears players
Portland Beavers players
Seattle Indians players
Oakland Oaks (baseball) players
Birmingham Barons players
Jersey City Skeeters players
People from Canton, Georgia